Allhallows-on-Sea station was the railway station for Allhallows-on-Sea, Kent from 1932 to 1961.

It was opened partly on the 14 and fully on 16 May 1932. It had an island platform with a run-round loop. Originally the branch from Stoke Junction was single track, but it was doubled in 1935, and singled again in 1957.

The station closed on 4 December 1961 and was demolished in 1975, although the listed water tank remains.

History
Opened by the Southern Railway the line passed on to the Southern Region of British Railways on nationalisation in 1948 and was then closed by the British Transport Commission.

References

Sources
 
 
 
 Station on navigable O.S. map

External links
 Allhallows-on-Sea station on 1946 O. S. map

Disused railway stations in Kent
Former Southern Railway (UK) stations
Railway stations in Great Britain opened in 1932
Railway stations in Great Britain closed in 1961
1932 establishments in England
1961 disestablishments in England
Transport in Medway